Daucus lopadusanus is a species of plant in the family Apiaceae.

References

Apioideae
Endemic biota of Europe
Flora of Malta